Rye Harbour LNR is a   local nature reserve in Rye in East Sussex. The site is part of the  nature reserve managed by the Sussex Wildlife Trust. It is also part of Dungeness, Romney Marsh and Rye Bay Ramsar site,  Special Protection Area and Site of Special Scientific Interest and Dungeness Special Area of Conservation.

This large reserve has diverse coastal habitats, including saltmarsh, shingle, reedbeds, saline lagoons, grazing marsh and flooded gravel pits.  More than 280 species of birds have been recorded, out of which 90 breed on the site. There are more than 450 flowering plant species, including 27 which are scarce and two which are endangered, least lettuce and stinking hawksbeard.

References

Local Nature Reserves in East Sussex
Sussex Wildlife Trust
Icklesham